Luca Germoni (born 1 September 1997) is an Italian footballer who plays as a left back.

Club career
He made his professional debut in the Serie B for Ternana on 7 September 2016 in a game against Pisa.

On 12 January 2019 he joined Juve Stabia on loan until the end of the 2018–19 season. Germoni helped the club with promotion to Serie B for the 2019–20 season and in July 2019 it was confirmed, that they had turned the deal into a permanent deal. 

On 7 January 2021, he joined Como on loan.

On 2 November 2021, he joined Südtirol as a free agent. On 23 November 2021, his contract was terminated by mutual consent for family reasons.

References

External links
 
 
 

1997 births
Living people
Footballers from Rome
Italian footballers
Association football defenders
Serie B players
Serie C players
S.S. Lazio players
Ternana Calcio players
Parma Calcio 1913 players
A.C. Perugia Calcio players
Virtus Entella players
S.S. Juve Stabia players
A.C. Reggiana 1919 players
Como 1907 players
F.C. Südtirol players
Italy youth international footballers